Hanno was a Carthaginian general serving under Mago Barca in the Second Punic War. He is sometimes mistaken for Hanno, son of Bomilcar.

Biography
He was sent to Spain in 206 BC by the Carthaginian senate to recruit Spanish mercenaries along with Mago Barca. Despite gathering an army in Celtiberia, including the mythical Larus, they were defeated and captured by the Romans under Marcus Junius Silanus.

After reaching Gades, Mago sent a prefect similarly named Hanno, who was defeated and killed by Silanus in 206 BC in the Battle of the Guadalquivir.

See also
 Other Hannos in Carthaginian history

References

Citations

Bibliography
 .

External links
 Index of names: Hanno

204 BC deaths
Carthaginian commanders of the Second Punic War
Year of birth unknown
3rd-century BC Punic people